Choice for a Better Life was a political coalition in Serbia, headed by Boris Tadić and his Democratic Party. They competed in the 2012 parliamentary election and won 22.07% of the popular vote. In the presidential election of the same year, Tadić won a plurality of votes in the first round, but narrowly lost to Tomislav Nikolić and the Let's Get Serbia Moving coalition in the second round.

Members

The coalition was composed of the following political parties:

See also
For a European Serbia
Let's Get Serbia Moving

References

External links
Official website

Defunct political party alliances in Serbia
Political parties with year of establishment missing
Political parties with year of disestablishment missing